Gretchen Palmer (born December 16, 1961) is an American television and film actress.

Biography

Born in Chicopee, Massachusetts, Palmer regards Ludlow as her hometown.

Career

She has had recurring roles in television series such as The Joe Schmo Show and The Parkers, and has appeared in films including Fast Forward, Crossroads, Red Heat, When Harry Met Sally... and Trois.

Filmography

Film

Television

References

External links

American film actresses
American television actresses
Living people
1961 births
People from Chicopee, Massachusetts
Actresses from Massachusetts
People from Ludlow, Massachusetts
21st-century American women